Clarence Berryman (August 10, 1906 – August 25, 1986) was an American wrestler. He competed in the men's freestyle lightweight at the 1928 Summer Olympics.

References

1906 births
1986 deaths
American male sport wrestlers
Olympic wrestlers of the United States
Wrestlers at the 1928 Summer Olympics
People from Okemah, Oklahoma